Sir David Carnegie, 1st Earl of Southesk, 1st Baron Carnegie of Kinnaird, 1st Baron Carnegie, of Kinnaird and Leuchards (1575–1658) was a Scottish nobleman. He was a member of the Privy Council of Scotland and held the office of Lord of Session. He was created an earl in 1633.

He was the eldest son of David Carnegie of Colluthie and his second wife, Euphame Wemyss (d. 1593), daughter of John Wemyss of Wemyss.

At the Union of the Crowns in 1603, James VI and I travelled to England. He wrote to David Carnegie from Newcastle upon Tyne on 10 April 1603, inviting him to escort the queen Anne of Denmark to England.

He married Margaret Lindsay, daughter of David Lindsay of Edzell and had several children:
 James Carnegie, 2nd Earl of Southesk.
 Sir Alexander Carnegie, married the sister of Robert Arbuthnott, 1st Viscount of Arbuthnott.
 Sir John Carnegie, died 22 November 1654.
 Lady Catherine Carnegie, married John Stewart, 1st Earl of Traquair.
 Lady Magdalene Carnegie, married James Graham, 1st Marquess of Montrose.
 Lady Margaret Carnegie, married William Ramsay, 1st Earl of Dalhousie.
 Marjory Carnegie, married Robert Arbuthnott, 1st Viscount of Arbuthnott.
 Lady Elizabeth Carnegie, married Andrew Murray, 1st Lord Balvaird.

References

Notes

1575 births
1658 deaths
Earls of Southesk
Peers of Scotland created by James VI
Shire Commissioners to the Parliament of Scotland
Members of the Privy Council of Scotland
Senators of the College of Justice
Members of the Parliament of Scotland 1612
Members of the Convention of the Estates of Scotland 1617
Members of the Convention of the Estates of Scotland 1621
Members of the Convention of the Estates of Scotland 1625
Members of the Convention of the Estates of Scotland 1630
Members of the Parliament of Scotland 1639–1641